Brian Wesley Shackelford (born August 30, 1976) is a former Major League Baseball pitcher. He batted and threw left-handed.

Career
He made his Major League debut for the Cincinnati Reds on June 26, and had an ERA of 2.30 in that season.

On July 28, Shackelford was traded by the Reds along with Calvin Medlock to the Tampa Bay Devil Rays for Jorge Cantú and Shaun Cumberland. On December 12, 2007, Shackelford signed a minor league contract with an invitation to spring training with the Los Angeles Dodgers, but was released during spring training.

For the  season, Shackelford signed with the Southern Maryland Blue Crabs of the Atlantic League. After his release on May 22, he signed with the Long Island Ducks on August 8.

External links

1976 births
Living people
Major League Baseball pitchers
Baseball players from Oklahoma
Cincinnati Reds players
Louisville Bats players
Long Island Ducks players
Southern Maryland Blue Crabs players
Oklahoma Sooners baseball players
Charleston AlleyCats players
Chattanooga Lookouts players
Criollos de Caguas players
Durham Bulls players
Potomac Cannons players
Scottsdale Scorpions players
Spokane Indians players
Wichita Wranglers players
Wilmington Blue Rocks players